Cockadoodledon't is the third studio album by American rock band Legendary Shack Shakers. Released on April 22, 2003, the album established the band's presence on the alternative country scene.

Musical style 
The music of Cockadoodledon't encompasses rockabilly, blues, alternative country, bluegrass, heavy metal, psychobilly, punk rock and Southern rock.

Reviews 

The album was reviewed by Stephen Haag of PopMatters.com, who concluded "All-at-once reverent, revisionist, greasy, and fun as hell, with summer upon us Cockadoodledon't should be the soundtrack to a thousand barbecues." Bob Gendron writing for AVguide stated "A mind-blowing assault on bluegrass rhythms, cowboy country, roadhouse blues, and sweaty rock and roll fury, Cockadoodledon't makes Reverend Horton Heat sound like The Eagles.". Mojo magazine rated the album 3 stars out of 5 - "...Featuring fine ensemble work and blues harmonica. A real rush of blood to the head...". And Hal Horowitz, writing for AllMusic, said "The music is fun, frantic, and nerve-wracking."

Track listing 
 "Pinetree Boogie"
 "CB Song"
 "Help Me from My Brain"
 "Shakerag Holler"
 "Hunkerdown"
 "Clodhopper"
 "Bullfrog Blues"
 "Blood on the Bluegrass"
 "Devil's Night Auction"
 "Wild Wild Lover"
 "Shake Your Hips"
 "Hoptown Jailbreak"

Personnel 
 Col. J.D. Wilkes - vocals, banjo, harmonica, keyboards
 JoeBuck - guitar, banjo, mandolin, key accordion, upright bass, drums

Additional personnel: Mark Robertson, Paul Simmons, Donnie Herron, Jason Brown, "Handsome" Andy Gibson

Song usage 
 "CB Song" was featured on a popular television advertisement for Geico Insurance.

References 

2003 albums
Legendary Shack Shakers albums
Bloodshot Records albums